Pushkarasari (Devanagari: पुष्करसारि) is an undeciphered writing system used in Gandhara (in what is now Afghanistan and Pakistan) and Central Asia from the 3rd century BC to the eighth century AD. Earlier, the script was called  "Kohi", but later study and deciphering of the script has identified the actual name of the script which is Puṣkarasāri, mentioned in different ancient literature.

This writing system bears some resemblance to both Brahmi script and Kharosthi script as well as a few Chinese characters.

References

Further reading
 Nasim Khan, M. (2007). Kohi Script: Discovery of another ancient Indian writing system. Gandhāran Studies, 1, 89-118. Journal of the Ancient and Medieval Gandhāra Research Group, British Association of South Asian Studies, UK.
 Nasim Khan, M. (2014). Cross Cultural Communication between Gandhara and China Before the 9th Century AD. New Archaeological Evidence. 83-97. Published in "Religion and Peoples, Silk Road", proceeding of the Conference held in South Korea in 2014. Published in 2015
 Nasim Khan, M. (2016). Kohi or Pushkarasari. The Story of an Un-deciphered Script from Gandhara. International Conference on Buddhist Archaeology in China and South Asia: 232-241. Conference held in Beijing in November 2016.
 Nasim Khan (2018). Kashmir Smast - The Earliest Seat of Hindu Learning (in two volumes). . Published by the Centre for Gandharan and Buddhist Studies.

Linguistic history of Pakistan
Undeciphered writing systems